Tubificina is a suborder of haplotaxid annelid worms.

References

 
Protostome suborders